Xifengite (Fe5Si3) is a rare metallic iron silicide mineral. The crystal system of xifengite is hexagonal. It has a specific gravity of 6.45 and a Mohs hardness of 5.5. It occurs as steel gray inclusions within other meteorite derived nickel iron mineral phases.

It was first described in 1984 and named for the eastern passageway, Xifengkou, of the Great Wall of China. The type locality is the Yanshan meteorite of the Hebei Province, China. It has also been reported from dredgings along the East Pacific Rise.

The other known natural iron silicide minerals are gupeiite, hapkeite, linzhiite, luobusaite, naquite, suessite, and zangboite.

See also
 Glossary of meteoritics

References

Iron(II,III) minerals
Meteorite minerals
Hexagonal minerals
Minerals in space group 193
Minerals described in 1984